A345 may refer to :
 A345 road (England), a secondary A road in Wiltshire connecting Salisbury and Marlborough
 Airbus A340-500
 Fujifilm FinePix A345, a basic point-and-shoot camera
 RFA Tarbatness (A345), a 1967 Royal Fleet Auxiliary fleet stores ship